Lhasa (102) is a Type 055 destroyer of the People's Liberation Army Navy. She was commissioned on 7 March 2021.

Development and design 
The People's Liberation Army Navy was interested in a large destroyer from as early as the late-1960s. A development program, code-named "055", initiated in 1976 was cancelled in 1983 after encountering insurmountable technical obstacles from industrial underdevelopment; for example, the required gas turbine power plants could neither be produced domestically, nor imported at acceptable prices. In April 2014, an image emerged of a full-scale mock-up of the Type 055 superstructure - with enclosed integrated mast for radar and other electronics at the Chinese naval electronic testing range in Wuhan.

The Type 055 is expected to undertake expeditionary missions and form the primary escort for Chinese aircraft carriers. The United States classifies these ships as cruisers.

Construction and career 
Lhasa was the second ship of the class and laid down and launched on 28 April 2018 at the Jiangnan Shipyard in Shanghai. On 27 January 2021, she was spotted at Hainan Island with hull number 102. The ship commissioned on 7 March 2021 and assigned to the North Sea Fleet. Tibetan newspaper Lhasa Daily reported that Vice Mayor of Lhasa travelled to the Qingdao military base to visit the officers and sailors of Lhasa.

References 

2018 ships
Ships built in China
Type 055 destroyers